Guillermo Vilas defeated the defending champion Jimmy Connors in the final, 2–6, 6–3, 7–6(7–4), 6–0 to win the men's singles tennis title at the 1977 US Open.

This was the third and last edition of the US Open to be played on clay courts; it switched the following year to hard courts.

The competition was played best-of-three sets in the first four rounds, followed by best-of-five sets from the quarterfinals onward.

Seeds
The seeded players are listed below. Guillermo Vilas is the champion; others show the round in which they were eliminated.

  Björn Borg (fourth round)
  Jimmy Connors (finalist)
  Brian Gottfried (quarterfinalist)
  Guillermo Vilas (champion)
  Manuel Orantes (quarterfinalist)
  Raúl Ramírez (first round)
  Ilie Năstase (second round)
  Vitas Gerulaitis (fourth round)
  Eddie Dibbs (third round)
  Dick Stockton (quarterfinalist)
  Roscoe Tanner (fourth round)
  Harold Solomon (semifinalist)
  Mark Cox (first round)
  Ken Rosewall (third round)
  Wojtek Fibak (fourth round)
  Stan Smith (second round)

Draw

Key
 Q = Qualifier
 WC = Wild card
 LL = Lucky loser
 r = Retired

Final eight

Section 1

Section 2

Section 3

Section 4

Section 5

Section 6

Section 7

Section 8

References

External links
 Association of Tennis Professionals (ATP) – 1977 US Open Men's Singles draw
1977 US Open – Men's draws and results at the International Tennis Federation

Men's singles
US Open (tennis) by year – Men's singles